Patric may refer to:
 PATRIC, the Pathosystems Resource Integration Center, a bacterial infectious disease information system
 Patric (singer) (born 1947), full name Patrick Martin, French singer
 Patric (footballer, born 1987), full name Anderson Patric Aguiar Oliveira, Brazilian football forward
 Patric (footballer, born 1989), full name Patric Cabral Lalau, Brazilian football right-back
 Patric (Spanish footballer) (born 1993), full name Patricio Gabarrón Gil, Spanish football right-back

See also
 Patrick (disambiguation), various meanings including a given name and a surname